Bunnies on the Bayou is a 501(c)(3) organization and the name of its similarly titled annual tradition among members of the LGBT community of Houston, Texas, in the United States. According to its website, the organization's mission is to raise funds for "various charitable, educational and cultural programs that seek to improve the quality of life for individuals in the LGBT community and promotes education and awareness of individual human rights within greater Houston area. The fundraiser is one of Houston's largest outdoor events and has been called the city's" largest annual outdoor cocktail party".

History
The event originated in 1979, when a group of friends hosted a birthday celebration on Easter at an apartment complex on Clay Street. News of the event spread; invitations were distributed and a sound system was installed the following year. During the HIV/AIDS pandemic of the 1980s, party organizers began charging "admission" in the form of food for local charitable organizations. Over time, the event continued to grow and admission evolved from food to monetary contributions. Bunnies on the Bayou has been held at Wortham Center Fish Plaza in downtown Houston since the 1990s. Since its inception, the fundraiser has raised more than $750,000 for local charities.

With the COVID-19 pandemic scrapping the 2020 event, the 42nd was deferred to 2021.

References

External links

  (Archived from the original)
 Beneficiaries, Bunnies on the Bayou
 Bunnies on the Bayou Gallery by Buck Bedia (2013), Houston Chronicle
 Bunnies on the Bayou Sets New Record (2012), Out Smart
 Muscles on display! Shirtless men and Easter bonnets keep Bunnies on the Bayou hopping' by Clifford Pugh (2013), CultureMap Houston

1979 establishments in Texas
Annual events in Texas
Charities based in Texas
LGBT culture in Houston
LGBT events in Texas
LGBT organizations in the United States
Organizations based in Houston
Recurring events established in 1979